Philipose Mar Eusebius (died 2009) was a bishop in India. From 1 August 1985 he has been designated as Assistant Metropolitan of Thumpamon Diocese and from 1990 onwards he became the Metropolitan of Thumpamon Diocese.

References

Year of birth missing
2009 deaths
Malankara Orthodox Syrian Church bishops